Woman of Steel is a UK England rugby league award.

Women of Steel is a sculpture in Sheffield, England.

Woman of Steel, Women of Steel, or variant, may also refer to:

 Woman of Steel (album), 2019 album by Yemi Alade
 Woman of Steel (telenovela), a U.S. Spanish language TV show
 A Woman of Steel (TV series), a 2013 Philippine telenovela
 Woman of Steel (TV series), a 2010 Malaysian ntv7 TV show
 , a chapter of Prison School, a Japanese manga

See also

 
 
 Iron Woman (disambiguation)
 Man of Steel (disambiguation)
 Men of Steel (disambiguation)
 Steelman (disambiguation)